Dandong, formerly known as Andong, is a coastal prefecture-level city in southeastern Liaoning province, in the northeastern region of People's Republic of China.

It is the largest Chinese border city, facing Sinuiju, North Korea across the Yalu River, which demarcates the Sino-North Korean border. To the southwest of the city, the river flows into Korea Bay. Dandong has therefore had a dynamic history because of its strategic location for the northeast's rich natural resources and because of its convenient access to the ocean. It is designated as a major export production centre for the province, and is a port city connected by rail with Shenyang and Sinuiju. A significant amount of trade with North Korea flows through the city.

Geography

Dandong is located on the western border of North Korea and the northwest (right) shore of the Yalu River, facing Sinuiju to the southeast. It is situated on the southeast corner of the Liaodong Peninsula, near the mouth of the Yalu River, which empties into the Korea Bay, which is part of the Yellow Sea. "great deer island") and Xiaomai Island.

Bordering prefectures are Dalian (SW), Anshan (W), Liaoyang (NW), and Benxi (N).

Climate
The area has long winters, and humid, somewhat hot summers belonging to the humid continental climate regime (Köppen Dwa). Winter usually begins in late November and continues until the end of March (about 4 months), with the most severe cold only lasting for around three weeks in December, January, or February. The coldest month, January, averages . Spring, though a period of quick warming, is delayed by one month compared to more inland parts of the province, and is somewhat dry until May. Summer heat is moderated by proximity to the coast; the city's warmest month, August, averages . With monthly percent possible sunshine ranging from 35% in July to 67% in February, the city receives 2,459 hours of sunshine annually and is, outside of the summer months, generally sunny.

Administrative divisions
Dandong is divided into 3 districts, 2 towns, and one autonomous county:

History

Maps and artifacts suggest that the area has been settled since the Gojoseon kingdom period.

During the Han dynasty (221 BC–220 AD), the Dandong region was under the jurisdiction of west Anping county. During the Goguryeo kingdom period, the region was the site for Bakjak Fortress. After the fall of the Goguryeo, in the early Tang dynasty (618–907), the Dandong region was under the jurisdiction of Andong Prefecture. In the 8th century, the area was conquered by King Mun of Balhae (r. 737–793). In Liao dynasty (916–1125), it was under the jurisdictions of the states Xuan, Kai, and Mu.

It fell under the jurisdiction of the state of Po-Su in the Jin dynasty, the state of Po-Sha in the Yuan dynasty, and the state of Liaodong in the Ming dynasty.

The area became known as Andong County in 1876. "" means "pacifying the east", reflecting the power that China had over Korea at the time. After the start of the first Sino-Japanese War in 1894, Andong County was occupied by Japan. During the Manchukuo era, it was the capital of Andong Province, one of the fourteen provinces established by Manchukuo. It was opened as an American treaty port in 1903. It was opened as a treaty port in 1907.

From November 1950 to February 1951, Dandong's Sino–Korean Friendship Bridge was bombed by the United States during the Korean War, as was an older iron bridge leading to North Korea. Even though the Sino–Korean Friendship Bridge was rebuilt, the remains of the Japanese-built iron bridge were left and now serve as a war monument.

On 20 January 1965, the city adopted its present name of Dandong, which means "red east," to avoid the connotations of its previous name, which was considered imperialistic by some. Recently, the city has been gaining influence in this region of China because of its market with North Korea and the government's future plans to develop the city into a special "Border Economic Cooperation Zone" for export and import in order to expand the country's ability to conduct trade.

In 2001, Dandong was granted the "Best Tourist Destination City" award by the National Tourism Administration. Four years later, the same administration granted it the award of "National Clean City."

Demographics

In the latest official census of 2000, Dandong's total resident population (which includes the districts of Zhenxing, Yuanbao and Zhen'an) was 780,414 people, while Dandong proper had a total population of 2.4 million. In 2005, the resident population was approximated to be 751,914 with a floating population of 176,926, for a total of 928,840. However, the non-agricultural (urban) population is said to consist of only 79.52% of the resident population (597,930). It is unclear what the floating population consists of or where they live, but it is suspected that most of the migrant population is people from the countryside looking for work, local and foreign businessmen, and students. In 2000, there were 244,430 family households (with a pop. of 741,882) and 4,955 collective households (with a pop. of 38,532). The demographic ratio of men to women was 99.52 males to every 100 females. Also, 81.61% of the population was above 15 years of age; thus, 18.39% of the population was under 15 in the year 2000.

Dandong is a multi-ethnic area, with 29 ethnic groups, including Han, Manchu, Mongolian, Hui, Korean, and Xibe. The ethnic Han people make up approximately 87.6% of the city's population. The Manchus are the second most populous ethnic group and officially make-up 9.6% of the population. The Manchu minority group has become so acculturated into the Han majority that there remains little or no distinction between the two, although a number of Manchu words have remained in the local lexicon. There is a thriving Korean minority group estimated at 20–30,000 ethnic Koreans which makes them the second largest minority in the city (at around 2.16%+ of the total estimated pop. for 2004). A number of signs and advertisements are in both Mandarin and Korean and there are many Korean restaurants and shops as well as some Korean churches, schools and other cultural institutions. The Hui make up the next most populous minority at 1.5%.

Economy

The total GDP of the city of Dandong is 9.52 billion yuan in the year 2009 (ranked 40th out of the 58 cities and counties in Liaoning province). The GDP per capita of the city of Dandong is 12414 Yuan in 2009 (ranked 52nd out of all 58 cities and counties in Liaoning province).

A substantial portion of North Korea's international trade, both legal and illegal, passes through Dandong and Sinuiju, across the Yalu River in North Korea. China handles roughly 40% of North Korea's worldwide export trade ($1.58 of US$4 billion) and roughly half of the bilateral commerce with China goes through Dandong which imports $468 million [USD worth of product], according to its Ministry of Commerce. Dandong's annual resident per capita wage income for 2004 was somewhere between ¥9,500 and ¥12,237 RMB and the city's GDP was US$3.77 billion.

Dandong is widely known in China for producing the Dandong Yellow Sea brand buses. The port of Dandong is being developed into the second major international logistics centre of Liaoning and has become a notable alternative to the port of Dalian. 

The city had "5.86 million tourists" in 2004, of which 16,000 of those travelled into North Korea; another 81,000 of those were from overseas and contributed US$27.54 million to the economy.  During 2004, "the total tourism income was 4.02 billion Yuan [RMB]," and this was an increase of almost 33% from the previous year.

Memory cards and teddy bears are among the most popular items for North Koreans shopping in Dandong.

Development zones
Dandong Border Economic Corporation Zone was approved as a national-level development zone in 1992. It is located on the bank of Yalu River, opposite the North Korean city of Sinuiju. It encourages the following industries: electronic information, machine manufacturing, biopharmaceuticals, among others.

Dandong Qianyang Economic Development Zone was first approved by Dandong City as a Special Economic Zone, in 1994 by Liaoning Province as Liaoning Dandong Qianyang Economic Development Zone (LDQEDZ). In July 2009, the development of the Liaoning Coastal Economic Belt was listed as a national strategy. Qianyang Town, situated at the eastern tip of the Belt is now an important component of Dandong's coastal development, and has an opportunity to demonstrate its strategic position.

Infrastructure

Railways

 Shenyang–Dandong intercity railway

Trains from Dandong to Shenyang are available several times a day with night trains to Beijing, Dalian, Changchun, Qingdao and Shanghai. From Dalian, the high speed train takes less than 3 hours, or from Beijing, less than 7 hours.

International trains link Dandong with Pyongyang daily. Both Chinese and North Korean carriages operating the through train from Beijing to Pyongyang (trains K27 and K28) are attached to the daily overnight train from Beijing to Dandong. In addition there are North Korean carriages which form a daily dedicated Dandong Pyongyang train.

Road

 China National Highway 201
 China National Highway 304
 G11 Hegang–Dalian Expressway
 G1113 Dandong–Fuxin Expressway

From the long-distance bus station, it takes about 10 hours to get to Beijing, four hours to Dalian and Tonghua, and three hours to Shenyang.

Air
Flights to and from Dandong Langtou Airport are limited, but one can always fly in/out of Dalian or Shenyang and then take the train or bus to/from Dandong. The airport is located 13 miles west of town and an airport shuttle is available. Domestic flights are available to Beijing, Qingdao, Sanya, Shanghai and Shenzhen.

Ports and waterways
The Port of Dandong is located on the right bank at the mouth of the Yalu River. It is bordered by the Yellow Sea in the south and is separated from the North Korea in the east. It was set up as a trading port in 1907. Since large-scale construction began in the mid-1980s, the Port, together with the ports at Dalian and Yingkou, has become an important distributing centre in northeast China.

In October 2011, the Chinese government announced a $7.1 billion expansion over five years to expand Dandong Port. Dai Yulin, secretary of the Dandong City Committee of the Chinese Communist Party noted that Dandong's unique geography ensures that the city is a hub for land-sea transportation, connecting 90 ports in over 70 countries. Several multinational companies including US-owned Harman, have made Dandong the location for their northeast Asian headquarters.

The waterways near the port have become an important tourist attraction in the region and include the Yalu River Park.

Landmarks

The city is across the river from Sinŭiju, North Korea. The two cities are connected by the Sino–Korean Friendship Bridge. Less than 100 meters downstream is the Yalu River Broken Bridge which was destroyed by American bombing during the Korean War. Tourists can rent speed boats or passenger boats to approach the border and get a closer look at the North Korean city of Sinŭiju. There is a  ferris wheel in Sinŭiju visible from across the Yalu River.

Other tourist attractions include the Memorial of the War to Resist US Aggression and Aid Korea, also known as the Korean War Museum, and the Jinjiang Mountain which used to be a Chinese army lookout and is now the city's largest park.

Outside of central Dandong, there are other landmarks such as: the Dagushan Scenic Area in Donggang, and Shuifeng Dam in Kuandian Manchu Autonomous County, and Fenghuang Mountain in Fengcheng.

Dandong is the only city in the area of the reservoir. The Black Creek Reservoir near the Shou artillery battalion has spas, sanatoriums and a summer resort to cater to tourism.

Culture

Cuisine 
Dandong fried fork seeds noodle (丹东炒叉子) is the most characteristic snack in Dandong, which is made of rice fork seeds as the main ingredient and yellow clam meat, leek, carrot, and round onion as the auxiliary ingredients, stir-fried with seasonings such as minced garlic and sesame oil. Rice fork is a Manchu food in the early days, made from corn, fermented and ground into watery noodles, and then made into smooth strips of chopstick thickness by hand or mold after settling.

Specialty 
Dandong yellow clams (丹东黄蚬子) are grown at the mouth of the Yalu River, where nutrients are abundant and the water temperature is suitable. Therefore, the yellow clams produced here are bigger and fatter than those from other places, and their nutritional value is also higher. Yellow clams have become the golden sign of Dandong seafood and were registered as a national geographical indication by the Chinese Ministry of Agriculture in 2011.

Education

Eastern Liaoning University is in Dandong. The city also has one international school, Eaglebridge International School.

Friendship cities
Dandong is a Sister City with the following cities:
 Paris, France (2008)
 Uijeongbu, Gyeonggi-do, South Korea (1997)
 Astrakhan, Astrakhan Oblast, Russia (1993)
 Tokushima, Tokushima, Japan (1991)
 Doncaster, South Yorkshire, United Kingdom (1988)
 Wilmington, North Carolina, United States (1986)

References

External links

Government website 
Government website (Archive)

 
China–North Korea border crossings
Cities in Liaoning
Prefecture-level divisions of Liaoning